Hellstugueggi or Helleggi is a mountain on the border of Fjord Municipality in Møre og Romsdal county and Skjåk Municipality in Innlandet county in Norway. The mountain is surrounded by several other notable mountains including Krosshø to the southeast and Breiddalseggi to the southwest.

See also
List of mountains of Norway

References

Skjåk
Fjord (municipality)
Mountains of Innlandet
Mountains of Møre og Romsdal